Gabriel Murr is a Lebanese politician and businessman who launched MTV in 1991, and is the brother of Michel Murr. He is an open critic of the relationship that Lebanon has had with the Syrian Government.

Personal life and Education
Gabriel Murr was born on 26 February 1939. He has a civil engineering degree from the American University of Beirut in 1963.

He married Hoda Roos with whom he has four children: Jihad, Michel, Carol and Carl.

Controversies
There was some controversy whether or not he had won the Matn election against his niece Mirna Murr, in order to enter the parliament in 2002 after the death of Albert Moukheiber, but it was decided that he had won the election.

In April 2019, he accused his son Michel of sending individuals to besiege his office.

See also 
 Mirna Murr

References 

1939 births
Living people
American University of Beirut alumni
Eastern Orthodox Christians from Lebanon
Lebanese mass media owners
Members of the Parliament of Lebanon